India is a union of states and union territories as per article 1 of the Indian Constitution. Some states and union territories are further divided into divisions, which are made up of groups of districts. A division is led by an officer of the Indian Administrative Service, known as a divisional commissioner. There are 102 divisions in India.

The states of Andhra Pradesh, Goa, Gujarat, Kerala, Manipur, Mizoram, Sikkim, Tamil Nadu, Telangana, and Tripura as well as five of the union territories are not divided into divisions.

Overview

Regions within states 
Some states consist of regions, which have no official administrative governmental status. They are purely geographic regions; some correspond to historic countries, states or provinces. A region may comprise one or more divisions, averaging about three divisions per region. However, the boundaries of the regions and the boundaries of the divisions do not always coincide exactly. So far there has been no movement to give the regions official administrative status. If this was to be done, it would presumably require that the boundaries of the regions be slightly modified so that they correspond exactly with their constituent districts.
 Regions of Assam
 Regions of Gujarat

List of divisions

See also
Administrative divisions of Assam
Administrative divisions of Bihar
Administrative divisions of Haryana
Administrative divisions of Jharkhand
Administrative divisions of Karnataka
Administrative divisions of Kerala
Administrative divisions of Uttar Pradesh
Administrative divisions of Uttarakhand
Administrative divisions of West Bengal

Notes

References

Administrative divisions of India